Larson House may refer to:

Swan Larson Three-Decker, a house in Worcester, Massachusetts, listed on the U.S. National Register of Historic Places (NRHP)
Dr. Albert M. and Evelyn M. Brandt House, Bismarck, North Dakota, also known as the Francis and Leona Larson House, NRHP-listed
August Cornelius Larson House, Madison, Wisconsin, listed on the NRHP